Mihael Frankovitsch was a 16th-century politician in Slovenia when the country was under the Holy Roman Empire. He became mayor of Ljubljana in 1555.
He was succeeded by Blaž Samerl in 1559.

References

Mayors of places in the Holy Roman Empire
Mayors of Ljubljana
Year of birth missing
Year of death missing
16th-century Slovenian people